The British Academy Television Award for Best Drama Series is one of the major categories of the British Academy Television Awards (BAFTAs), the primary awards ceremony of the British television industry. The category is described on the official BAFTA website as being open a drama series "of between two and 19 episodes, that is intended to return."

The category has been through several name and category changes:
 From 1958 to 1972 the award was presented usually individually under the name "Best Drama Production".
 Also during the same period another category was awarded briefly as "Best Drama Series" from 1964 to 1970.
 Then from 1970 to 1991 it was joined with drama serials into a category named "Best Drama Series or Serial" with the exception of the years 87, 88 and 89 where it was awarded just as "Best Drama Series".

From 1992 onwards, the category was split in two, with a separate Best Drama Serial category also established.

Inspector Morse, Cracker, The Cops, The Street and Happy Valley have all won the category twice, all except the last in successive years.

Winners and nominees

1950s
Best Drama Production

1960s
Best Drama Production

Best Drama Series

1970s
Best Drama Production

Best Drama Series

Best Drama Series or Serial

1980s
Best Drama Series or Serial

Best Drama Series

1990s
Best Drama Series or Serial

Best Drama Series

2000s

2010s

2020s

Note: The series that don't have recipients on the table had Production team credited as the recipients of the award or nomination.

Television Dramas with multiple awards nominations

Multiple awards
The following television series have won the British Academy Television Award for Best Drama Series multiple times:

2 awards
Cracker (consecutive)
Happy Valley
The Cops (consecutive)
The Street (consecutive)

Multiple nominations
The following television series have been nominated for the British Academy Television Award for Best Drama Series multiple times:

6 nominations
Spooks

4 nominations
Clocking Off
The Crown
Shameless

3 nominations
Casualty
Cracker
Misfits
The Cops
The Street

2 nominations
Being Human
Between the Lines
Bodies
Common as Muck
Cold Feet
Doctor Who
Happy Valley
Inspector Morse
Jonathan Creek
Life on Mars
Line of Duty
Peaky Blinders
Playing the Field
Scott & Bailey
The End of the F***ing World

References

External links
List of winners at the British Academy of Film and Television Arts

Drama Series
British drama
1992 establishments in the United Kingdom
Awards established in 1992